Nollywood Babylon is a 2008 feature documentary film directed by Ben Addelman and Samir Mallal. Produced by the National Film Board of Canada, it is about the explosive popularity of Nigerian movies. The United Kingdom distributor is Dogwoof Pictures.

See also
Welcome to Nollywood
This Is Nollywood

References

External links
 
Nollywood Babylon at NFB.ca

2008 films
English-language Canadian films
National Film Board of Canada documentaries
Canadian documentary films
Documentary films about African cinema
Films directed by Ben Addelman
Films directed by Samir Mallal
2008 documentary films
Documentary films about Nigeria
2000s Canadian films